Christine I. Mitchell (born December 8, 1951) is an American filmmaker and bioethicist and until her retirement in September 2022, the executive director of the Center for Bioethics at Harvard Medical School (HMS).

Education
Mitchell studied nursing at Boston University, where she earned both bachelor's and master's degrees in the field.  She then studied philosophical and religious ethics and the ethics of care at Harvard University and the Harvard Divinity School, where she earned a master's degree.

 1969 – Narragansett Regional High School, Baldwinville, Massachusetts, diploma
 1973 – Boston University, School of Nursing, Boston, Massachusetts, BSN
 1979 – Boston University, School of Nursing, Boston, Massachusetts, MS, Nursing and Pediatrics
 1982 – Harvard Divinity School/Harvard University, Cambridge, Massachusetts, MTS, Ethics
1982–1983 – Course Professor, Ethical issues in Health Care, Graduate Program, Boston University School of Nursing, Boston, Massachusetts
 1991–1994 – Boston College, Chestnut Hill, Massachusetts, PhD (ABD), Ethics, Philosophy, Nursing (University Fellow)

Ethics Fellowships:

 1979—1981 - Harvard Medical School, Joseph P. Kennedy Jr. Fellow in Medical Ethics, Interfaculty Program of Harvard University but done at HMS
 1993—1994 - Harvard University, Fellowship in Ethics and the Professions at Safra Center

Academic Appointments

 1976–1979 - Assistant Professor of Nursing, University of Virginia School of Nursing, Charlottesville, Virginia
 Visiting Professor, DeMontfort University, Leicester, UK
 Co-PI, End-of-Life Care Project, University of Zurich, Department of Biomedical Ethics and University Hospital, Zurich, Switzerland
 1991–2014 - Hospital Ethicist and Director, Office of Ethics, Children's Hospital, Boston.
 1993–2014 - Associate Director (Previously Lecturer, then Senior Lecturer), Harvard Medical School Division of Medical Ethics, Department of Global Health and Social Medicine
2014–present - Executive Director, Center for Bioethics, Harvard Medical School

Career 
She is known for her role in shaping the field in clinical ethics consultations for morally difficult issues in hospital settings.  She is a founding member of the American Society for Bioethics Consultation, on which she currently serves, and American Society for Bioethics and Humanities's Clinical Ethics Consultation Affairs standing committee, and most recently, the Ethics Advisory Board of the Human Brain Project's Ethics and Society Subproject, funded by the European Commission. She is a former president of the American Society for Law, Medicine, and Ethics, where she serves on the editorial board of its journal, and the Freedom from Cancer Challenge, where she is a project Advisor.

Mitchell developed an interest in nursing ethics during her years at Boston University, which led her to pursue a Master of Theological Studies degree emphasizing ethics at Harvard University and the Harvard Divinity School in Cambridge.  Between those two programs, however, she practiced clinical nursing for several years in Boston and Charlottesville, Virginia, where she became Assistant Professor of Nursing at University of Virginia School of Nursing.

Prior to her role with Harvard's Center for Bioethics, formerly the Division of Medical Ethics (DME) (where she had been associate director before its reorganization), she taught ethics and professional courses for medical students and in the Master of Bioethics Degree Program while on the faculty of the HMS Department of Global Health and Social Medicine.

Her research focuses on clinical ethics consultation and public engagement in bioethics policies, including end-of-life issues, assisted reproductive technologies, and resource allocation related to major natural disasters or pandemics. Mitchell also leads the Ethics Leadership Group for Harvard-affiliated teaching hospitals and health care facilities.  She has contributed to the development of nursing ethics as a discipline.

Center for Bioethics
Mitchell has been involved in ethics work at Boston Children's Hospital, where she founded the hospital's ethics program, directed the hospital's ethics consultation service, and led its Ethics Advisory Committee for thirty years.  She has provided ethics consultation at Massachusetts General Hospital, Baystate Medical Center, Beth Israel Deaconess Medical Center, North Shore Medical Center in Salem, Massachusetts, and Maine Medical Center.

In the Center for Bioethics, Mitchell co-founded with Carol Powers, JD, the volunteer citizen Community Ethics Committee for "informed public input on ethical aspects of health care and health policies."  She also developed the annual Harvard Clinical Bioethics Course, leads monthly clinical ethics and Harvard Research Ethics Consortia, and teaches in the HMS Fellowship in Bioethics Program.

Professional activities

Since 2002, Mitchell has edited ethics cases for The Journal of Clinical Ethics, where she has been on the editorial board since 1989 and is currently its associate editor. She lectures outside Harvard on clinical ethics issues  In 2009, the American Society for Bioethics and Humanities formed the Clinical Ethics Consultation Affairs standing committee (CECA) in order to address growing concerns that those providing clinical ethics consultation (CEC) were unqualified.

She is a clinical practice team member of the Johns Hopkins Berman Institute of Bioethics, which produced A Blueprint for 21st Century Nursing Ethics: Report of the National Nursing Summit.
She is a member of the advisory committee for the Cambridge Consortium for Bioethics Education, which produces and publishes Cambridge Quarterly of Healthcare Ethics.  She also is an advisory board member of the Neuroethics Network (Paris).

In 2018, she was elected vice president of the Association of Bioethics Program Directors,

Films and media 

Mitchell's first ethics media was an instructional interactive computer videodisc in 1990, Nursing Ethics and Law, which she produced with two collaborators.

With filmmaker Ben Achtenberg (with whom she has worked for over 26 years, and sometimes with others) she has produced six documentary videos.  She was an associate producer of "Code Gray: Ethical Dilemmas in Nursing", a documentary film, which was nominated for (but not awarded) an Academy Award in 1984; their 2002 video, Stanley, about ethical decisions in caring for a patient with end stage kidney failure, was part of a 3-film documentary series
 and awarded a 2004 Freddie award for medical media.  Their 2003 video, Everyday Choices, concerned a visiting nurse and an elderly patient facing ethical questions about waning capacities and independence.

She is an advisor to The Refugee Media Project, sponsored by The Center for Independent Documentary, also of Boston.

Awards
 1983, MNA Nursing Practice Award, Massachusetts Nursing Association (MNA)
 1984 Academy Award nomination, short documentary Code Gray: Ethical Dilemmas in Nursing
 1985, MNA Image of the Professional Nurse Award - Christine I. Mitchell, Massachusetts Nursing Association (MNA)
 2004, International Freddie Award for medical media
 2010, Living Legends in Massachusetts Nursing Award, American Nurses Association Massachusetts
 2018, Nursing Ethics Leadership Award, National Nursing Ethics Conference
 2018, President-Elect, Association of Bioethics Program Directors

Publications

Christine Mitchell has published on the ethics of medical practice, end-of-life care, pediatrics, fetal medicine, gender, oncology, reality medical television, religion, surgery, and current topics in bioethics. Her interests recently have expanded to the universal human right to benefit from the progress of science.

Selected bibliography

See also 
 Nursing ethics
 Patient advocacy
 Philosophy of healthcare
 Right to science and culture

References

External links 
 Harvard Catalyst profile for Christine Mitchell
 Meet the speakers

American women philosophers
American women nurses
20th-century American women writers
21st-century American philosophers
20th-century American philosophers
People from Gardner, Massachusetts
Harvard Divinity School alumni
Boston University School of Nursing alumni
University of Virginia faculty
Harvard Medical School faculty
21st-century American women writers
Bioethicists
Morrissey College of Arts & Sciences alumni
1951 births
Filmmakers from Massachusetts
Living people
People from Jamaica Plain